MV Red Jet 6 is a high-speed Catamaran ferry constructed for Red Funnel in East Cowes on the Isle of Wight as the sixth member of the company's expansive Red Jet line of catamarans.

Red Funnel announced in May 2015 that they had placed an order for the £6 million vessel with Shemara Refit LLP of East Cowes, making Red Jet 6 the first high-speed ferry built in the UK in fifteen years. Red Jet 6 was constructed in East Cowes's former aircraft hangar, originally built for the Saunders-Roe aircraft company. She entered service in the summer of 2016.

She can operate with one engine out with only a minor reduction in speed.

Red Jet 6 was named by the Princess Royal at a ceremony at East Cowes on 4 July 2016.

See also
Red Jet 3
Red Jet 4
Red Jet 5
Red Jet 7

References

External links 

 
 Red Jet 6 Construction time lapse at East Cowes

Ferries
Individual catamarans
Ferry transport on the Isle of Wight
Ships of Red Funnel
2016 ships